Anders Dahl (born 11 March 1976) is a Danish Olympic dressage rider. He competed at the 2016 Summer Olympics in Rio de Janeiro where he finished 30th in the individual and 6th in the team competition.

Dahl also competed at the 2006 World Equestrian Games, placing 4th in team dressage. In 2008, he participated at Dressage World Cup final in Den Bosch where he finished 10th.

He was married to the fellow dressage rider Fiona Bigwood.

In 2016, Dahl and his wife relocated from Bourne Hill House in Horsham in West Sussex to Brantridge Park where they have established an equestrian centre.

Notable horses 
 Afrikka - 1990 Bay Gelding
 2006 World Equestrian Games - Team Fourth Place, Individual 34th Place
 2008 FEI World Cup Final - Tenth Place
 Selten HW - 2004 Black Hanoverian Gelding (Sandro Hit x Hohenstein)
 2016 Rio Olympics - Team Sixth Place, Individual 30th Place

References

External links
 

Living people
1976 births
Danish male equestrians
Danish dressage riders
Equestrians at the 2016 Summer Olympics
Olympic equestrians of Denmark
People from Balcombe, West Sussex